"Save the Life of My Child" is a song by American music duo Simon & Garfunkel from their fourth studio album, Bookends (1968).

Background
"Save the Life of My Child" was one of many songs on Bookends recorded with production assistant John Simon.

Composition
An audio sample of the band's first hit, "The Sound of Silence", softly plays during a cacophony of sounds near the end of "Save the Life of My Child." John Simon, who was credited with production assistance on the song, created the bassline by playing a Moog synthesizer with help from Robert Moog himself. James Bennighof, author of The Words and Music of Paul Simon, considers the churning, distorted groove and electronic instrumentation an accompanying textural element to the subject matter: suicidal suburban youth. "Save the Life of My Child" is a dramatic story involving drugs, violence and a mother and child relationship. According to Bennighof, the song "deals with individual crises in crowded urban settings, along with references to larger societal forces and at least a hint of some transcendent perspective."

References

Bibliography 
 
 

1968 songs
Simon & Garfunkel songs
Songs about suicide
Songs written by Paul Simon
Song recordings produced by John Simon (record producer)
Song recordings produced by Paul Simon
Song recordings produced by Art Garfunkel